A team representing Ireland as an independent state or polity has competed at the Summer Olympic Games since 1924, and at the Winter Olympic Games since 1992. The Olympic Federation of Ireland (OFI) was formed in 1922 during the provisional administration prior to the formal establishment of the Irish Free State. The OFI affiliated to the International Olympic Committee (IOC) in time for the Paris games. 

For many sports, the respective national federation represents the entire island of Ireland, which comprises both the Republic of Ireland (originally a dominion with the title the Irish Free State) and Northern Ireland (which following the founding of the Irish Free State as an independent dominion remained part of the United Kingdom). Northern Ireland-born athletes are entitled to represent either Ireland or Great Britain and Northern Ireland, as they are automatically entitled to the citizenship of both countries. As a result, athletes will tend to  represent the National Olympic Committee of the nation to which his or sport federation is aligned. The smaller competition pool will also see athletes choose to represent Ireland to ensure greater Olympic qualification chances. 

In addition, Ireland has regularly been represented by members of the Irish diaspora who are explicitly recognised in the nation's constitution, and who often have citizenship rights through family heritage e.g. a grandparent with Irish citizenship. 

From the first modern-era games in 1896 until the 1920 games, Ireland was represented by the Great Britain and Ireland team. In early editions of the Games, 'Ireland' as a team was entered in certain events as one of several Great Britain and Ireland entries that mirrored the Home Nations.

To date, the highest number of medals won at an Olympiad is six, at the 2012 London games. The highest number of golds is three, at the 1996 Atlanta games, when Michelle Smith won all of Ireland's medals.

Boxing however is by far Ireland's most successful sport at the games, accounting for more than 50% of the medals won. Athletics has provided the most gold medals, with four.

Many of the sports most popular in Ireland are either not Olympic sports (such as Gaelic games, horse racing) or have only become so relative recently (Golf, rugby sevens, and this is reflected in a somewhat moderate overall record for Ireland at the Games outside of boxing. Notwithstanding this, however, Ireland has been a consistent and enthusiastic Olympic nation, and its medalists are widely publicised and celebrated, while Olympic qualification is highly valued even without medal success. Ireland notably was one of the nations that boycotted neither the 1980 Moscow or 1984 Los Angeles Games. Ireland did, however, choose not to participate in the 1936 Berlin Games in Nazi Germany.

Medal tables

Medals by Summer Games

Medals by Winter Games 
As of 2021, Ireland's best result at the Winter Games has been fourth, by Clifton Wrottesley in the Men's Skeleton at the 2002 Games in Salt Lake City.

Medals by summer sport

List of medallists 
The following tables include medals won by athletes on OCI teams. All medals have been won at Summer Games. Ireland's best result at the Winter Games has been fourth, by Clifton Wrottesley in the Men's Skeleton at the 2002 Games in Salt Lake City. Some athletes have won medals representing other countries, which are not included on these tables.

Medallists

Doping 

Awarded:
  Robert Heffernan finished fourth in the 2012 men's 50 kilometres walk won by Sergey Kirdyapkin. On 24 March 2016, the Court of Arbitration for Sport disqualified all Kirdyapkin's competitive results from 20 August 2009 to 15 October 2012. Heffernan was upgraded to third, and formally presented with a bronze medal in November 2016.

Stripped:
 Cian O'Connor received the gold medal in the 2004 individual showjumping, but was formally stripped of it in July 2005 because his horse failed the post-event doping test.

Banned but not stripped:
 Michelle Smith was banned from competitive swimming for four years by FINA two years after the 1996 Summer Olympics, for tampering with her urine sample using alcohol. She appealed the decision to the Court of Arbitration for Sport (CAS). FINA submitted evidence from Jordi Segura, head of the IOC-accredited laboratory in Barcelona, that said she took androstenedione, a metabolic precursor of testosterone, in the previous 10-to-12 hours before being tested. Smith denied this and androstenedione was not a banned substance. The CAS upheld the ban. She was 28 at the time, and the ban effectively ended her competitive swimming career. Smith was not stripped of her Olympic medals, as she had never tested positive for any banned substances. Her coach and husband, Erik De Bruin, previously served a four-year ban for using illegal drugs during his career as a discus thrower.

Medallists in art competitions 

Art competitions were held from 1912 to 1948. Irish entries first appeared in 1924, when they won two medals; a third was won in the 1948 competition.

Before independence

Prior to 1922, Ireland was part of the United Kingdom of Great Britain and Ireland: thus, competitors at earlier Games who were born and living in Ireland are counted as British in Olympic statistics. At early Olympics, Irish-born athletes also won numerous medals for the United States and Canada, notably the "Irish Whales" in throwing events.

The Irish Amateur Athletic Association was invited to the inaugural International Olympic Committee meeting in 1894, and may have been invited to the 1896 games: it has also been claimed the Gaelic Athletic Association was invited. In the event, neither participated.

Prior to the 1906 Intercalated Games, National Olympic Committees (NOCs) were generally non-existent, and athletes could enter the Olympics individually. John Pius Boland, who won gold in two tennis events in 1896, is now listed as "IRL/GBR". Boland's daughter later claimed that he had objected when the Union Jack was raised to mark his first triumph, vehemently pointing out that Ireland had a flag of its own; following this, the organisers apologised and agreed to prepare an Irish flag. While Kevin MacCarthy is sceptical of this story, by 1906, Boland was crediting his medals to Ireland.

Tom Kiely, who won the "all-around" athletics competition at the 1904 Olympics in St Louis is also listed as competing for Great Britain. He had raised funds in counties Tipperary and Waterford to travel independently and compete for Ireland. Frank Zarnowski does not regard the 1904 event as part of the Olympic competition, and also doubts the story that Kiely had refused offers by both the English Amateur Athletic Association (AAA) and the New York Athletic Club to pay his fare and cover his travel expenses so he could compete for them. Peter Lovesey disagrees with Zarnowski.

The British Olympic Association (BOA) was formed in 1905, and Irish athletes were accredited to the BOA team from the 1906 Games onwards. Whereas Pierre de Coubertin had recognised teams from Bohemia and Finland separately from their respective imperial powers, Austria and Russia, he was unwilling to make any similar distinction for Ireland, either because it lacked a National Olympic Committee, or for fear of offending Britain.

At the 1906 Games, both Peter O'Connor and Con Leahy objected when the British flag was raised at their victory ceremony, and O'Connor raised a green Irish flag in defiance of the organisers.<ref>{{cite journal|date=15 February 2008 |title=This Flag Dips for No Earthly King': The Mysterious Origins of an American Myth'|journal=International Journal of the History of Sport|publisher=Routledge|volume=25 |issue=2 |pages=142–162 |doi=10.1080/09523360701740299|s2cid=216151041}}</ref>

At the 1908 Games in London, there were multiple BOA entries in several team events, including two representing Ireland. In the hockey tournament, the Irish team finished second, behind England and ahead of Scotland and Wales. The Irish polo team also finished joint second in the three-team tournament, despite losing to one of two English teams in its only match.

At the 1912 Olympics, and despite objections from other countries, the BOA entered three teams in the cycling events, one from each of the separate English, Scottish and Irish governing bodies for the sport. The Irish team came 11th in the team time trial. The organisers had proposed a similar division in the football tournament, but the BOA declined.

A 1913 list of 35 countries to be invited to the 1916 Olympics included Ireland separately from Great Britain; similarly, Finland and Hungary were to be separate from Russia and Austria, although Bohemia was not listed. A newspaper report of the 1914 Olympic Congress says it endorsed a controversial German Olympic Committee proposal that "now—contrary to the hitherto existing practice—only political nations may participate as teams in the Olympic Games", with the "United Kingdom of Great Britain and Ireland" among these "political nations". However, the games were cancelled due to the First World War.

After the war, John J. Keane attempted to unite various sports associations under an Irish Olympic Committee. Many sports had rival bodies, one Unionist and affiliated to a United Kingdom parent, the other Republican and opposed to any link with Great Britain. Keane proposed that a separate Irish delegation, marching under the Union Flag, should participate at the 1920 Summer Olympics in Antwerp. At the time the Irish War of Independence was under way, and the IOC rejected Keane's proposal, pending the settlement of the underlying political situation.

Political issues
The OCI has always used the name "Ireland", and has claimed to represent the entire island of Ireland, even though Northern Ireland remains part of the United Kingdom. These points have been contentious, particularly from the 1930s to the 1950s in athletics, and until the 1970s in cycling.

Northern Ireland

The governing bodies in the island of Ireland of many sports had been established prior to the 1922 partition, and most have remained as single all-island bodies since then. Recognition of the Irish border was politically contentious and unpopular with Irish nationalists.  The National Athletic and Cycling Association (Ireland), or NACA(I), was formed in 1922 by the merger of rival all-island associations, and affiliated to both the International Amateur Athletics Federation (IAAF) and Union Cycliste Internationale (UCI). When Northern Ireland athletes were selected for the 1928 games, the possibility was raised of using an "all-Ireland banner" as the team flag, rather than the Irish tricolour which unionists disavowed. J. J. Keane stated that it was too late to change the flag registered with the IOC, but was hopeful that the coat of arms of Ireland would be adopted afterwards.

In 1925, some Northern Ireland athletics clubs left NACA(I) and in 1930 formed the Northern Ireland Amateur Athletics Association, which later formed the British Athletic Federation (BAF) with the English and Scottish Amateur Athletics Associations. The BAF then replaced the (English) AAA as Britain's member of the IAAF, and moved that all members should be delimited by political boundaries. This was not agreed in time for the 1932 Summer Olympics —at which two NACA(I) athletes won gold medals for Ireland— but was agreed at the IAAF's 1934 congress. The NACA(I) refused to comply and was suspended in 1935, thus missing the 1936 Berlin Olympics. The OCI decided to boycott the Games completely in protest.

The UCI likewise suspended the NACA(I) for refusing to confine itself to the Irish Free State. The athletics and cycling wings of the NACA(I) split into two all-island bodies, and separate Irish Free State bodies split from each and secured affiliation to the IAAF and UCI. These splits were not fully resolved until the 1990s. The "partitionist" Amateur Athletic Union of Éire (AAUE) affiliated to the IAAF, but the all-Ireland NACA(I) remained affiliated to the OCI.  The IOC allowed AAUÉ athletes to compete for Ireland at the 1948 London Olympics, but the rest of the OCI delegation shunned them. At that games, two swimmers from Northern Ireland were prevented from competing in the OCI team.  This was a FINA ruling rather than an IOC rule; Danny Taylor from Belfast was allowed by FISA to compete in the rowing. The entire swimming squad withdrew, but the rest of the team competed.

Some athletes born in what had become the Republic of Ireland continued to compete for the British team. In 1952, new IOC President Avery Brundage and new OCI delegate Lord Killanin agreed that people from Northern Ireland would in future be allowed to compete in any sport on the OCI team. In Irish nationality law, birth in Northern Ireland grants a citizenship entitlement similar to birth within the Republic of Ireland itself. In 1956, Killanin stated that both the OCI and the BOA "quite rightly" judged eligibility based on citizenship laws.  
UCI and IAAF affiliated bodies were subsequently affiliated to the OCI, thus regularising the position of Irish competitors in those sports at the Olympics.  Members of the all-Ireland National Cycling Association (NCA) with Irish Republican sympathies twice interfered with the Olympic road race in protest against the UCI-affiliated Irish Cycling Federation (ICF). In 1956, three members caused a 13-minute delay at the start. Seven were arrested in 1972; three had delayed the start and the other four joined mid-race to ambush ICF competitor Noel Taggart, causing a minor pileup. This happened days after the murders of Israeli athletes and at the height of the Troubles in Northern Ireland; the negative publicity helped precipitate an end to the NCA–ICF feud.

The Irish Hockey Union joined the OCI in 1949, and the Ireland team in non-Olympic competitions is selected on an all-island basis. Until 1992 the IHU was not invited to the Olympic hockey tournament, while Northern Irish hockey players like Stephen Martin played on the British Olympic men's team. In 1992, invitation was replaced by an Olympic qualifying tournament, which the IHU/IHA has entered, despite some opposition from Northern Irish members. Northern Irish players can play for Ireland or Britain, and can switch affiliation subject to International Hockey Federation clearance. The Irish Ladies Hockey Union has entered the Olympics since 1984, and in 1980 suspended Northern Irish players who elected to play for the British women's team.

Through to the 1960s, Ireland was represented in showjumping only by members of the Irish Army Equitation School, as the all-island civilian equestrian governing body was unwilling to compete under the Republic's flag and anthem.

In November 2003, the OCI discovered that the British Olympic Association (BOA) had been using Northern Ireland in the text of its "Team Members Agreement" document since the 2002 Games. Its objection was made public in January 2004. The BOA responded that "Unbeknown to each other both the OCI and BOA have constitutions approved by the IOC acknowledging territorial responsibility for Northern Ireland", the BOA constitution dating from 1981. OCI president Pat Hickey claimed the IOC's copy of the BOA constitution had "question marks" against mentions of Northern Ireland (and Gibraltar); an IOC spokesperson said "Through an error we have given both national Olympic committees rights over the same area." The 2012 Games host was to be selected in July 2004 and so, to prevent the dispute harming the London bid, its director Barbara Cassani and the Blair government secured agreement by which Northern Ireland was removed from BOA documents and marketing materials. Northern Ireland athletes retain the right to compete for Britain.

In October 2004, Lord McIntosh of Haringey told the House of Lords:

By contrast, OCI officers Pat Hickey and Dermot Sherlock told an Oireachtas committee in 2008:

Hickey also said:

In 2012, Stephen Martin, who has been an executive at both the OCI and the BOA, said "Team GB is a brand name. Just like Team Ireland. The British and Irish Olympic committees are seen by the International Olympic Committees as having joint rights over Northern Ireland."

In 2009, rugby sevens was added to the Olympic programme starting in 2016. While World Rugby states players from Northern Ireland are eligible to compete on the Great Britain team, the Irish Rugby Football Union (IRFU) director of rugby said in 2011 that "with the agreement of the [English, Scottish, and Welsh] unions" the "de facto position" was that Northern Ireland players must represent an IRFU team. In 2010 The Daily Telegraph''  opined that the IRFU would be entitled to refuse to release players under contract to it, but not to prohibit Northern Ireland players based outside Ireland; but that the issue needed to be handled "with extreme sensitivity".

Name of the country

The OFI sees itself as representing the island rather than the state, and hence uses the name "Ireland". It changed its own name from "Irish Olympic Council" to "Olympic Council of Ireland" in 1952 to reinforce this point. (The change from "Council" to "Federation" was a 2018 rebranding after the 2016 ticketing controversy.) At the time, Lord Killanin had become OCI President and delegate to the IOC, and was trying to reverse the IOC's policy of referring to the OCI's team by using an appellation of the state rather than the island.  While the name "Ireland" had been unproblematic at the 1924 and 1928 Games, after 1930, the IOC sometimes used "Irish Free State". IOC President Henri de Baillet-Latour supported the principle of delimitation by political borders. At the 1932 Games, Eoin O'Duffy persuaded the Organisers to switch from "Irish Free State" to "Ireland" shortly before the Opening Ceremony. After the 1937 Constitution took effect, the IOC switched to "Eire"; this conformed to British practice, although within the state's name in English was "Ireland".  At the opening ceremony of the 1948 Summer Olympics, teams marched in alphabetical order of their country's name in English; the OCI team was told to move from the I's to the E's. After the Republic of Ireland Act came into effect in 1949, British policy was to use "Republic of Ireland" rather than "Eire". In 1951, the IOC made the same switch at its Vienna conference, after IOC member Lord Burghley had consulted the British Foreign Office. An OCI request to change this to "Ireland" was rejected in 1952, In late 1955 Brundage ruled that "Ireland" would be the official IOC name, and  Lewis Luxton of the Organising Committee for the 1956 Melbourne Games said that "Ireland" would be used on scoreboards and programmes. The OCI had argued that this was the name in the state's own Constitution, and that all the OCI's affiliated sports except the Football Association of Ireland were all-island bodies.  However, in the buildup to the Games, Lord Burghley (now Marquess of Exeter) protested at the IOC decision and insisted that the athletics events would use the IAAF name of "Eire". On the first day of athletics, "Ireland" (code "IRE") was used, but from the second day it changed to "Eire"/"EIR".

See also
 List of flag bearers for Ireland at the Olympics
 :Category:Olympic competitors for Ireland
 Ireland at the Paralympics
 Ireland at the British Empire Games
 2016 Summer Olympics ticket scandal

References

Sources

Notes

External links